Flagstaff station is an Amtrak train station at 1 East Route 66 in Flagstaff, Arizona.  The station, formerly an Atchison, Topeka and Santa Fe Railway depot, doubles as a visitor center and rental-car pickup and is located in downtown Flagstaff. Northern Arizona University is located nearby, as are the Lowell Observatory (where Pluto was discovered), Sunset Crater, the Walnut Canyon National Monument, ski resorts and other attractions.

History 

AT&SF built the depot in 1925, opening on January 5, 1926. Adjacent is the 1886 solid-red sandstone freight depot originally built by the Atlantic and Pacific Railroad. Both the former Santa Fe Depot and the Atlantic and Pacific Depot that it replaced are contributing properties to the Railroad Addition Historic District.

Routes 
 Southwest Chief
 Flagstaff Shuttle provides shuttle service between Flagstaff and any city in Arizona.
 Mountain Line city bus service
 Open Road Tours shuttle services to Phoenix, Camp Verde, Sedona, Oak Creek, Williams, and the Grand Canyon depart from the Amtrak station.
 Flagstaff Shuttle and Charter provides custom time private shuttles from Amtrak to the Grand Canyon, Sedona, and Snowbowl Ski Area.
 Greyhound operates intercity bus service from its nearby station

Some Greyhound and Open Road services may be booked through Amtrak.

References

External links 

 Flagstaff Amtrak Station (US Rail Guide – TrainWeb)
 

Amtrak stations in Arizona
Atchison, Topeka and Santa Fe Railway stations in Arizona
Buildings and structures in Flagstaff, Arizona
Buildings and structures on U.S. Route 66
Railway stations in the United States opened in 1926
Historic district contributing properties in Arizona
Transportation in Coconino County, Arizona
Tudor Revival architecture in Arizona
National Register of Historic Places in Coconino County, Arizona
Railway stations on the National Register of Historic Places in Arizona
1926 establishments in Arizona